Nordic combined at the 1960 Winter Olympics consisted of one event, held from 21 February to 22 February. The ski jumping portion took place at Papoose Peak Jumps, while the cross-country portion took place at McKinney Creek Stadium (Tahoma, California).

Competition opened with the ski jumping event. Standings were determined by a point system under the parameters of combined distance points (3 jumps per competitor) and "style" points awarded for each attempt. The table below reflects the best distance out of three attempts.

The following day, the second part of the Nordic Combined mandated the 15 kilometer cross-country competition. Points were awarded by timing (set number of points by timed placing). The combined points total of both events determined the final standings.

This event marked the first time the Däscher Technique was used in the ski jumping part of the Nordic Combined competition.

Medal summary

Medal table

The medals for Germany and the Soviet Union were the first for those countries in Nordic combined.

Events

Individual

Athletes did three normal hill ski jumps, with the lowest score dropped. They then raced a 15 kilometre cross-country course, with the time converted to points. The athlete with the highest combined points score was awarded the gold medal.

Participating NOCs

Thirteen nations participated in Nordic combined at the Squaw Valley Games. Australia made their Olympic Nordic combined debut.

References

External links
 Sports-Reference - 1960 Olympics - Nordic Combined - Individual

 
1960 Winter Olympics events
1960
1960 in Nordic combined
Sports in Tahoma, California
Nordic combined competitions in the United States
Men's events at the 1960 Winter Olympics